Cajeta de piña y plátano or Pineapple and banana dessert is a sweet fruit paste found in Mexican cuisine. There is a recipe for it published in a 19th-century cookbook from Guadalajara. It is made with crushed pineapple and mashed bananas blended with sugar syrup and baked until a thick, dark brown paste is obtained. It can be served with queso fresco.

References

Banana dishes
Guadalajara, Jalisco
Mexican desserts
Pineapple dishes